Patti Ruff (born 1972) is a former Democratic member of the Iowa House of Representatives, representing the 56th district. Before serving in the legislature, Ruff worked for Bunge North American, helping farmers sell and transport grain down the Mississippi River.  She lost her seat in the 2016 general election.  In an 2022 interview with NBC news, Ruff stated that the reason she lost her re-election bid was because she "had a D next to her name" on the ballot, and her opponent ran an ad with Ruff standing with Hillary Clinton.

Ruff was born in Richardson, Texas, and raised in McGregor, Iowa. She graduated from MarMac High School and earned a degree in history from Loras College. Ruff and her husband Dan have three sons.

References

External links
 Patti Ruff at Iowa Legislature
 
 Biography at Ballotpedia

1972 births
Date of birth unknown
Living people
Democratic Party members of the Iowa House of Representatives
People from Richardson, Texas
People from McGregor, Iowa
Women state legislators in Iowa
Loras College alumni
21st-century American politicians
21st-century American women politicians